Kilakudiammanjakki is a village in the  
Aranthangi revenue block of Pudukkottai district, Tamil Nadu, India.

Demographics 

As per the 2001 census, Kilakudiammanjakki had a total population of  
51 with 21 males and 30 females. Out of the total population,  
36 people were literate.

References

Villages in Pudukkottai district